The Prince House is a historic house in rural northern White County, Arkansas. It is a single story wood-frame structure, with a double-pen plan topped by a gable roof that transitions into a shed-roof over the front porch. The porch is supported by wooden posts, and has separate entrances to each pen. Built about 1920, it is one of the modest number of box-frame houses in the county to survive from that period.

The house was listed on the National Register of Historic Places in 1992.

See also
National Register of Historic Places listings in White County, Arkansas

References

Houses on the National Register of Historic Places in Arkansas
Houses completed in 1920
Houses in White County, Arkansas
National Register of Historic Places in White County, Arkansas
1920 establishments in Arkansas